Eulalia is a genus of polychaete worms.

Species
The World Register of Marine Species includes the following species in the genus :

Eulalia anoculata Hartman & Fauchald, 1971
Eulalia artica Annenkova, 1946
Eulalia aurea Gravier, 1896
Eulalia austrophylliformis Uschakov, 1972
Eulalia bilineata (Johnston, 1840)
Eulalia brevicornis (Moore, 1894)
Eulalia brunnea (Hartmann-Schröder, 1963)
Eulalia clavigera (Audouin & Milne Edwards, 1833)
Eulalia dubia Webster & Benedict, 1884
Eulalia ellipsis (Dalyell, 1853)
Eulalia eos Michaelsen, 1897
Eulalia expusilla Pleijel, 1987
Eulalia gemina Kato & Mawatari, 2001
Eulalia gracilior (Chamberlin, 1919)
Eulalia gravieri Uschakov, 1972
Eulalia hanssoni Pleijel, 1987
Eulalia havaica Kinberg, 1866
Eulalia hutchinsonensis (Perkins, 1984)
Eulalia impostii Quatrefages, 1865
Eulalia incompleta Quatrefages, 1866
Eulalia lanceolata Hartmann-Schröder, 1981
Eulalia lapsus Pleijel, 1991
Eulalia levicornuta Moore, 1909
Eulalia lobocephala Schmarda, 1861
Eulalia lobulata Moore, 1894
Eulalia longocirrata Støp-Bowitz, 1948
Eulalia magalaensis Kinberg, 1866
Eulalia megalops Verrill, 1900
Eulalia meniceros Pruvot, 1883
Eulalia meteorensis Böggemann, 2009
Eulalia mexicana Fauchald, 1972
Eulalia microoculata Pleijel, 1987
Eulalia microphylla Schmarda, 1861
Eulalia mucosa Quatrefages, 1866
Eulalia mustela Pleijel, 1987
Eulalia myriacyclum (Schmarda, 1861)
Eulalia novaezelandiae (Grube, 1880)
Eulalia ornata Saint-Joseph, 1888
Eulalia pachycirra Hartman, 1978
Eulalia pacifica (Imajima, 1964)
Eulalia personata Gravier, 1907
Eulalia pulchra Langerhans, 1884
Eulalia pusilla Ørstedt, 1843
Eulalia quadricornis Örsted, 1843
Eulalia quadrioculata Moore, 1906
Eulalia rubiginosa Saint-Joseph, 1888
Eulalia sandwichensis Uschakov, 1975
Eulalia saxicola Quatrefages, 1866
Eulalia semenovi Averincev, 1972
Eulalia sigeformis Annenkova, 1937
Eulalia subulifera Ehlers, 1897
Eulalia tenax (Grube, 1878)
Eulalia thileniusi Augener, 1927
Eulalia tjalfiensis Ditlevsen, 1917
Eulalia trilineata de Saint-Joseph, 1888
Eulalia tripunctata McIntosh, 1874
Eulalia varia Ehlers, 1908
Eulalia venusta de Saint Joseph, 1888
Eulalia viridis (Linnaeus, 1767)

References

Polychaete genera
Taxa named by Marie Jules César Savigny